Liudmyla Naumenko (born June 30, 1993) is a Ukrainian basketball player for ESB Villeneuve-d'Ascq and the Ukrainian national team.

She participated at the EuroBasket Women 2017.

References

1993 births
Living people
Small forwards
Ukrainian expatriate basketball people in France
Ukrainian women's basketball players